The Treaty of Peace, Friendship, Commerce and Navigation of 1856 between Chile and Argentina was the first boundary treaty  between Argentina and Chile. Article 39 of the treaty proposed the use of direct diplomatic negotiations and arbitration to resolve disputes. It established that the boundaries should be based on the uti possidetis principle based on what each country possessed before the Chilean and Argentine wars of independence beginning in 1810. It also postponed the solution of disputes into the future. Article 40 of this treaty established a 12 year limit on the effect of its articles about commerce and navigation.  The Boundary treaty of 1881 between Chile and Argentina mentions this treaty to say that the later treaty is "in fulfillment" of Section 39 of this treaty.

Sources
Tratado de paz, amistad, comercio y navegación entre la República de Chile y la Confederación Argentina Wikisource

References

Argentina–Chile treaties
Argentina-chile Treaty, 1856
Argentina-chile Treaty, 1856
Argentina-chile Treaty, 1856